Petrostroma is a genus of sponges belonging to the family Minchinellidae.

Fossil species of this genus are found in Europe, but the extant type species, P. schulzei, is found in Sagami Bay, Japan.

Species:
 Petrostroma schulzei Döderlein, 1892

References

Calcaronea
Sponge genera